Las Mirañas is a settlement in Mirití-Paraná Municipality, Amazonas Department Department in Colombia.

Climate
Las Mirañas has a tropical rainforest climate (Af) with heavy to very heavy rainfall year-round.

References

Populated places in the Amazonas Department